David Brown Kenny (22 May 1891 – 11 December 1978) was a Scottish professional footballer who played as a centre half in the Football League for Grimsby Town and Bristol Rovers.

Personal life 
Kenny worked as a shoemaker. In February 1915, six months since the outbreak of the First World War, he enlisted as a private in the Football Battalion of the Middlesex Regiment. He was wounded in 1916 and emigrated to Canada after the war.

Career statistics

References

1891 births
Footballers from South Ayrshire
Scottish footballers
Maybole F.C. players
Girvan F.C. players
Falkirk F.C. players
Barrow A.F.C. players
Grimsby Town F.C. players
Bristol Rovers F.C. players
English Football League players
Shoemakers
British Army personnel of World War I
Middlesex Regiment soldiers
British emigrants to Canada
People from Maybole
Association football wing halves
1978 deaths
Military personnel from South Ayrshire